Garon is a French surname. It is derived from the Germanic personal name Garo, meaning "ready", as well as from places in the Loire and Rhône departments.

People with the name
Alban Garon (1930–2007), Canadian judge
Jesse Garon Presley (1935), Twin brother of Elvis Aaron Presley, creator of Rockabilly music. 
Jean Garon (1938–2014), Canadian politician, lawyer, academic and economist 
Jesse Garon (musician) (born 1962), French singer-songwriter
Joseph Garon (1814–1890), Canadian notary and politician
Mathieu Garon (born 1978), Canadian ice hockey player
Paul Garon, American author, writer and editor
Pauline Garon (1900–1965), Canadian-born American silent film actress
Sheldon Garon, American historian
Timothy Garon (1951–2008), American singer-songwriter

See also
 Garo (name)

References

French-language surnames
Toponymic surnames